The Focke-Wulf A 32 Bussard (German: "Buzzard") was a small airliner produced in Germany in the early 1930s. It was developed rapidly at the request of NOBA when Messerschmitt was unable to deliver aircraft on schedule. Based closely on the A 20, the A 32 had a revised fuselage with greater seating capacity, and an engine of over twice the power. The two examples operated by NOBA became part of Deutsche Luft Hansas fleet in 1934.

The flight deck was enclosed on the A.32 and was incorporated into the fuselage below and ahead of the high-mounted thick wing. The passenger cabin was under and aft of the wing. The tailskid undercarriage featured a wider tread on the mainwheels, and those wheels were supported by struts running up to the wings' undersides. The nose-mounted piston engine was cooled by a radiator, mounted in the airstream on the belly of the fuselage, under the flight deck.

Specifications

References

 
 
 German aircraft between 1919-1945

1930s German airliners
A 32
Single-engined tractor aircraft
High-wing aircraft
Aircraft first flown in 1930